Two ships of the French Navy have borne the name Magicienne, after magicienne (feminine of magician): 
She was burnt to avoid capture in 1810.
 , a  40-gun ship wrecked in 1840.

French Navy ship names